Paul Elliott may refer to:

 Paul Elliott (politician) (born 1954), former Australian politician
 Paul Elliott (cinematographer), American cinematographer
 Paul Elliott (footballer) (born 1964), British football defender
 Paul Elliott (epidemiologist) (born 1954), professor of epidemiology and public health medicine
 Paul Mark Elliott, British actor
 Paul Elliott, English comedian and one of the Chuckle Brothers
 Paul Elliott (baseball), Australian baseball coach, Baseball at the 2004 Summer Olympics
Paul Elliott (rugby league) (born 1960), former Australian rugby league player

See also
 Paul Elliott Martin (1897–?), American bishop